The 1942 Maryland Terrapins football team represented the University of Maryland in the 1942 college football season. In their first season under head coach Clark Shaughnessy, the Terrapins compiled a 7–2 record (1–2 in conference), finished in 13th place in the Southern Conference, and outscored their opponents 198 to 124. The team's victories included shutouts against Connecticut (34–0) and Florida (13–0). Shaughnessy returned as Maryland's head coach in 1946.

Schedule

References

Maryland
Maryland Terrapins football seasons
Maryland Terrapins football